Live At Sasquatch Festival 2010 is a live album by Canadian alternative rock band Jets Overhead. The album was released on  May 3, 2011 and contains live recordings of the 2010 Sasquatch Festival. The album includes songs that appeared on Jets Overhead’s self-titled EP, Bridges, and No Nations.

Track listing 
 "Sun Sun Sun" – 4:00
 "No Nations" – 2:57
 "Sure Sign" – 3:12
 "Always a First Time" – 3:08
 "Seems So Far" – 5:04
 "Where Did You Go" – 3:30
 "Heading For Nowhere" – 3:53
 "Tired of the Comfort" – 5:18
 "Mirror Mirror" - 6:00

Personnel 
 Adam Kittredge: Vocals, Guitar
 Antonia Freybe-Smith: Vocals, Keyboards
 Jocelyn Greenwood: Bass
 Piers Henwood: Guitars, Keyboards
 Luke Renshaw: Drums, Percussion, Vocals

References

External links 
 Jets Overhead Official Website

Sources 
 http://jetsoverhead.com/
 http://jetsoverhead.com/news
 https://itunes.apple.com/us/album/live-at-sasquatch-live-nation/id429831576
 http://intonato.com/?p=505

2010 live albums
Jets Overhead albums